"Live" is a song by the American rock band The Merry-Go-Round, written by band member Emitt Rhodes for their only album, The Merry-Go-Round (1967).

Release
"Live" was the Merry-Go-Round's highest charting single, and peaked at #63 on the Billboard Hot 100 in the spring of 1967. The song was recorded by The Bangles for their debut album ''All Over the Place in 1984.

References

1967 songs
A&M Records singles